Bacıyân-ı Rûm (literally Sisters of Rûm) was an alleged female militia organization in the late Anatolian Beyliks era.

Origins 
The term bâciyân-ı Rûm was first time mentioned in the 15th century by Aşıkpaşazade, alongside other groups called gāziyân-ı Rûm (Ghazis of Rum), ahîyân-ı Rûm (Akhis of Rum) and abdalân-ı Rûm (Abdals of Rum). Another record appears in Bertrandon de la Broquière's travelogue. La Broquière mentioned that the Beylik of Dulkadir had a Turkmen militia consisting of women.

Since Bâciyân-ı Rûm was an organization made up of women and that no such group was mentioned in any other source than Aşıkpaşazade's work, it attracted the attention of many researchers. It was claimed that it might be a mistake of copying to take the form of the word "bâciyân" (sisters). Franz Taeschner argued that the original of this might be hajiyân-ı Rûm (pilgrims of Rum) or bahşiyân-ı Rûm (clerks of Rum). Zeki Velidi Togan also supported this view. Mehmet Fuat Köprülü argued that female members of Haji Bektash Veli's sect were given the nickname "bacı", therefore saw the existence of this organization possible.

References

History of the Turkish people
Oghuz Turks
All-female military units and formations
History of women in Turkey